Anjelika Kour is a Siberian-American entrepreneur and Managing Director of an NYC design agency DigitalDesign.NYC.

Early life
Born to Alla and Vladimir Kour (son of the late chess champion & grandmaster Ruvim Kour). 

She was raised in Barnaul, Russia. After modeling for over 10 years with many brands, namely L’Oreal, KMS, Redken, Toni & Guy - she proceeded to build a career in design and technology.

Career
Anjelika Kour was the first hire at Harri.com, New York City's largest hospitality recruitment platform. In 2014, Kour founded a fashion platform Brick & Portal in New York City. A year later, she founded a SoHo design agency DigitalDesign.NYC in 2015.

References

Sources

Date of birth missing (living people)
Living people
American people of Russian descent
People from Barnaul
Year of birth missing (living people)